The Punjab legislative assembly election, 2012 was held on 30 January 2012, to elect 117 members to the Punjab Legislative Assembly. The results of the election were announced on 6 March 2012. The ruling Shiromani Akali Dal – Bharatiya Janata Party alliance led by Parkash Singh Badal won the elections.

Background
Punjab have tradition of transfer of power every 5 years between Shiromani Akali Dal and Indian National Congress but this election of 2012 is different from others where ruling party again came to power

2012 Assembly Elections in Punjab received attention for being the first elections after reorganisation of Punjab in 1966 to witness the return of an incumbent party.

This elections also saw the emergence of new political leadership, like rise of Sukhbir Singh Badal and the rise and fall of Manpreet Singh Badal, the founder of the Peoples Party of Punjab.

Religion and Caste Data 
Religion Data

As per the 2011 census,

Caste Data

 Dalits (Scheduled Castes) constitute 31.94% of the population, the highest percentage amongst all the states.
 Other Backward Classes (OBCs) like -Sainis, Sunar, Kambojs, Tarkhans/Ramgarhias, Gurjars, Kumhars/Prajapatis, Telis, Banjaras, Lohars constitute 31.3% of the population.
 Jat-Sikhs comprise 21% of the population while other forward castes (general category) - Brahmins, Khatris/Bhapas, Bania, Thakurs/Rajputs constitute around rest.
 As of 2016, Government of India has not publicly released Socio Economic and Caste Census 2011 caste population data for every single non-SC/ST castes (General castes, OBC/EBCs) in India.

Timeline of events 

Schedule for General Election to the Legislative Assembly of Punjab 2012

Voter Turnout

Parties and Alliances





Sanjha Morcha

Others

Opinion Polls
Most of the opinion polls predicted that Congress will win the election. They were proved wrong as Congress finished as the runner up.

Exit Polls 
2012 exit polls for Punjab Assembly Elections results.

Results

Party-wise Results

Result by region 

Among parties:

Result by district

Result by constituency

By-polls 2012-2017

See also 
 Politics of Punjab, India
 2017 Punjab Legislative Assembly election
 2007 Punjab Legislative Assembly election

References

External links

 https://www.epw.in/journal/2012/14/special-statistics-2012-state-elections-special-issues-specials/fourteenth-assembly

5. https://eci.gov.in/files/file/3455-punjab-2012/

2012 State Assembly elections in India
State Assembly elections in Punjab, India
2010s in Punjab, India
January 2012 events in India